Jaksonów  is a village in the administrative district of Gmina Żórawina, within Wrocław County, Lower Silesian Voivodeship, in south-western Poland.

Monuments 
 Medieval stone cross (probably conciliation cross)
 Baroque statue of St. John of Nepomuk

References

Villages in Wrocław County